Muzan may refer to:
 Muzan, Khuzestan (موزان - Mūzān)
 Muzan, Ahvaz (موزان - Mūzān), Khuzestan Province
 Muzan, Sistan and Baluchestan (موزن - Mūzan)